Richard Solomon III (born June 18, 1992) is an American professional basketball player for Zenit Saint Petersburg of the VTB United League. He played college basketball for California.

High school career
Solomon began in Bishop Montgomery High School, but transferred to Frederick K. C. Price High School, where he averaged 16.9 points, 9.0 rebounds and a team-best 3.0 blocks, making all-state and the All-CIF first team. When he graduated, he was listed No. 20 among power forwards, according to Rivals. com.

College career
Solomon played his collegiate career for California, where he played in 109 games and averaged 8.1 points, 7.0 rebounds and 1.1 blocks in 22.5 minutes with a 51.2 percent shooting. His best season was as a senior, where he averaged 11 points, 10.2 rebounds and 1.3 blocks per contest.

Professional career

Oklahoma City Blue (2014–2015)
After going undrafted in the 2014 NBA draft, Solomon signed with the Oklahoma City Thunder on September 29, 2014. However, on October 24, he was waived by the Thunder after three preseason games. On November 4, he signed with the Oklahoma City Blue of the NBA Development League. In 28 games, he averaged 8.5 points, 6.9 rebounds, 0.6 steals and 0.5 blocks.

Alvark Tokyo (2015–2016)
In July 2015, Solomon joined the Thunder for the 2015 NBA Summer League. On July 25, he signed with Toyota Alvark Tokyo of the Japanese National Basketball League. In 59 games, he averaged 11.3 points and 8.8 rebounds.

Gravelines-Dunkerque (2016–2017)
In July 2016, Solomon spent time with the Thunder and the Phoenix Suns on the 2016 NBA Summer League. On September 20, 2016, Solomon signed with the Atlanta Hawks, but was waived on October 1. Five days later, he signed with BCM Gravelines-Dunkerque of the French LNB Pro A.

Uşak Sportif (2017–2018)
On June 21, 2017, Solomon signed with Uşak Sportif of the Turkish Basketball Super League. In 19 games, Solomon averaged 9.6 points and 4.8 rebounds per game, shooting 58.7 percent from the floor.

Second stint with Oklahoma City Blue (2018–2019)
On September 23, 2018, Solomon signed with the Oklahoma City Thunder. On October 10, 2018, Solomon was waived by the Thunder. Solomon was added to the Oklahoma City Blue training camp roster on October 23, 2018.

On February 14, 2019 he signed a 10 day contract with the Oklahoma City Thunder,

Solomon was not offered a second 10-day contract after his first one expired thus returned to the Oklahoma City Blue.

JDA Dijon Basket (2019–2020)
On August 7, 2019, Solomon signed with JDA Dijon Basket of the LNB Pro A and the Basketball Champions League. He averaged 12 points and 5.9 rebounds per game.

Toyama Grouses (2020–2021)
On September 18, 2020, Solomon signed with the Toyama Grouses of the B.League. He averaged 17.1 points, 10.4 rebounds and 1.3 assists per game.

Bahçeşehir Koleji (2021–2022)
On October 21, 2021, Solomon signed with Bahçeşehir Koleji of the Turkish Basketball Super League (BSL).

Zenit Saint Petersburg (2022–present)
On July 31, 2022, he has signed with Zenit Saint Petersburg of the VTB United League.

Personal life
He is the son of Richard Jr. and Sheryl Solomon and has three older sisters.

References

External links
 California Golden Bears bio
 RealGM profile
 Sports-Reference profile
 TBLStat.net Profile

1992 births
Living people
Alvark Tokyo players
American expatriate basketball people in France
American expatriate basketball people in Japan
American expatriate basketball people in Turkey
American men's basketball players
Basketball players from Los Angeles
BCM Gravelines players
California Golden Bears men's basketball players
JDA Dijon Basket players
Oklahoma City Blue players
Power forwards (basketball)
Basketball players from Inglewood, California
United States men's national basketball team players
Uşak Sportif players